Library science (often termed library studies, bibliothecography, and library economy) is an interdisciplinary or multidisciplinary field that applies the practices, perspectives, and tools of management, information technology, education, and other areas to libraries; the collection, organization, preservation, and dissemination of information resources; and the political economy of information. Martin Schrettinger, a Bavarian librarian, coined the discipline within his work (1808–1828) Versuch eines vollständigen Lehrbuchs der Bibliothek-Wissenschaft oder Anleitung zur vollkommenen Geschäftsführung eines Bibliothekars. Rather than classifying information based on nature-oriented elements, as was previously done in his Bavarian library, Schrettinger organized books in alphabetical order. The first American school for library science was founded by Melvil Dewey at Columbia University in 1887.

Historically, library science has also included archival science. This includes how information resources are organized to serve the needs of selected user groups, how people interact with classification systems and technology, how information is acquired, evaluated and applied by people in and outside libraries as well as cross-culturally, how people are trained and educated for careers in libraries, the ethics that guide library service and organization, the legal status of libraries and information resources, and the applied science of computer technology used in documentation and records management.

There is no generally agreed-upon distinction between the terms library science and librarianship. To a certain extent, they are interchangeable perhaps differing most significantly in connotation. The term library and information studies (alternatively library and information science), abbreviated as LIS, is most often used; most librarians consider it as only a terminological variation, intended to emphasize the scientific and technical foundations of the subject and its relationship with information science. LIS should not be confused with information theory, the mathematical study of the concept of information. Library philosophy has been contrasted with library science as the study of the aims and justifications of librarianship as opposed to the development and refinement of techniques.

Theory and practice
Many practicing librarians do not contribute to LIS scholarship but focus on daily operations within their own libraries or library systems. Other practicing librarians, particularly in academic libraries, do perform original scholarly LIS research and contribute to the academic end of the field.

Whether or not individual professional librarians contribute to scholarly research and publication, many are involved with and contribute to the advancement of the profession and of library science through local, state, regional, national, and international library or information organizations.

Library science is very closely related to issues of knowledge organization; however, the latter is a broader term that covers how knowledge is represented and stored (computer science/linguistics), how it might be automatically processed (artificial intelligence), and how it is organized outside the library in global systems such as the internet. In addition, library science typically refers to a specific community engaged in managing holdings as they are found in university and government libraries, while knowledge organization, in general, refers to this and also to other communities (such as publishers) and other systems (such as the Internet). The library system is thus one socio-technical structure for knowledge organization.

The terms information organization and knowledge organization are often used synonymously. The fundamentals of their study (particularly theory relating to indexing and classification) and many of the main tools used by the disciplines in modern times to provide access to digital resources (abstracting, metadata, resource description, systematic and alphabetic subject description, and terminology) originated in the 19th century and were developed, in part, to assist in making humanity's intellectual output accessible by recording, identifying, and providing bibliographic control of printed knowledge. 

Information has been published that analyses the relations between the philosophy of information (PI), library and information science (LIS), and social epistemology (SE).

History

17th century

The earliest text on "library operations", Advice on Establishing a Library was published in 1627 by French librarian and scholar Gabriel Naudé.
Naudé wrote prolifically, producing works on many subjects including politics, religion, history, and the supernatural. He put into practice all the ideas put forth in Advice when given the opportunity to build and maintain the library of Cardinal Jules Mazarin.

19th century

Martin Schrettinger wrote the second textbook (the first in Germany) on the subject from 1808 to 1829.

Thomas Jefferson, whose library at Monticello consisted of thousands of books, devised a classification system inspired by the Baconian method, which grouped books more or less by subject rather than alphabetically, as it was previously done.

The Jefferson collection provided the start of what became the Library of Congress.

The first American school of librarianship opened at Columbia University under the leadership of Melvil Dewey, noted for his 1876 decimal classification, on January 5, 1887, as the School of Library Economy. The term library economy was common in the U.S. until 1942, with the term, library science, predominant through much of the 20th century. Key events are described in "History of American Library Science: Its Origins and Early Development."

20th century
Later, the term was used in the title of S. R. Ranganathan's The Five Laws of Library Science, published in 1931, and in the title of Lee Pierce Butler's 1933 book, An Introduction to Library Science (University of Chicago Press).

S. R. Ranganathan conceived the five laws of library science and the development of the first major analytical-synthetic classification system, the colon classification.

In the United States, Lee Pierce Butler's new approach advocated research using quantitative methods and ideas in the social sciences with the aim of using librarianship to address society's information needs. He was one of the first faculty at the University of Chicago Graduate Library School, which changed the structure and focus of education for librarianship in the twentieth century. This research agenda went against the more procedure-based approach of the "library economy," which was mostly confined to practical problems in the administration of libraries.

William Stetson Merrill's A Code for Classifiers, released in several editions from 1914 to 1939, is an example of a more pragmatic approach, where arguments stemming from in-depth knowledge about each field of study are employed to recommend a system of classification. While Ranganathan's approach was philosophical, it was also tied more to the day-to-day business of running a library. A reworking of Ranganathan's laws was published in 1995 which removes the constant references to books. Michael Gorman's Our Enduring Values: Librarianship in the 21st Century features the eight principles necessary by library professionals and incorporates knowledge and information in all their forms, allowing for digital information to be considered.

In more recent years, with the growth of digital technology, the field has been greatly influenced by information science concepts. In the English-speaking world the term "library science" seems to have been used for the first time in India in the 1916 book Punjab Library Primer, written by Asa Don Dickinson and published by the University of Punjab, Lahore, Pakistan. This university was the first in Asia to begin teaching "library science". The Punjab Library Primer was the first textbook on library science published in English anywhere in the world. The first textbook in the United States was the Manual of Library Economy by James Duff Brown, published in 1903. In 1923, C. C. Williamson, who was appointed by the Carnegie Corporation, published an assessment of library science education entitled "The Williamson Report," which designated that universities should provide library science training. This report had a significant impact on library science training and education. Library research and practical work, in the area of information science, have remained largely distinct both in training and in research interests.

21st century
The digital age has transformed how information is accessed and retrieved. "The library is now a part of a complex and dynamic educational, recreational, and informational infrastructure." Mobile devices and applications with wireless networking, high-speed computers and networks, and the computing cloud have deeply impacted and developed information science and information services. The evolution of the library sciences maintains its mission of access equity and community space, as well as the new means for information retrieval called information literacy skills. All catalogs, databases, and a growing number of books are available on the Internet. In addition, the expanding free access to open-source journals and sources such as Wikipedia has fundamentally impacted how information is accessed. Information literacy is the ability to "determine the extent of information needed, access the needed information effectively and efficiently, evaluate information and its sources critically, incorporate selected information into one’s knowledge base, use information effectively to accomplish a specific purpose, and understand the economic, legal, and social issues surrounding the use of information, and access and use information ethically and legally."

Education and training 

Academic courses in library science include collection management, information systems and technology, research methods, information literacy, cataloging and classification, preservation, reference, statistics and management. Library science is constantly evolving, incorporating new topics like database management, information architecture and information management, among others. With the mounting acceptance of Wikipedia as a valued and reliable reference source, many libraries, museums, and archives have introduced the role of Wikipedian in residence. As a result, some universities are including coursework relating to Wikipedia and Knowledge Management in their MLIS programs.

Most schools in the US only offer a master's degree in library science or an MLIS and do not offer an undergraduate degree in the subject. About fifty schools have this graduate program, and seven are still being ranked. Many have online programs, which makes attending more convenient if the college is not in a student's immediate vicinity. According to US News online journal, the University of Illinois is at the top of the list of best MLIS programs provided by universities. Second is the University of North Carolina and third is the University of Washington.

Most professional library jobs require a professional post-baccalaureate degree in library science or one of its equivalent terms. In the United States and Canada the certification usually comes from a master's degree granted by an ALA-accredited institution, so even non-scholarly librarians have an original academic background. In the United Kingdom, however, there have been moves to broaden the entry requirements to professional library posts, such that qualifications in, or experience of, a number of other disciplines have become more acceptable. In Australia, a number of institutions offer degrees accepted by the ALIA (Australian Library and Information Association). Global standards of accreditation or certification in librarianship have yet to be developed.

In academic regalia in the United States, the color for library science is lemon.

The Master of Library Science (MLIS) is the master's degree that is required for most professional librarian positions in the United States and Canada. The MLIS is a relatively recent degree; an older and still common degree designation for librarians to acquire is the Master of Library Science (MLS), or Master of Science in Library Science (MSLS) degree. According to the American Library Association (ALA), "The master’s degree in library and information studies is frequently referred to as the MLS; however, ALA-accredited degrees have various names such as Master of Arts, Master of Librarianship, Master of Library and Information Studies, or Master of Science. The degree name is determined by the program. The [ALA] Committee for Accreditation evaluates programs based on their adherence to the Standards for Accreditation of Master's Programs in Library and Information Studies, not based on the name of the degree

Employment outlook and opportunities
According to U.S. News & World Report, library and information science ranked as one of the "Best Careers of 2008". The median annual salary for 2020 was reported by the U.S. Bureau of Labor Statistics as $60,820 in the United States. Additional salary breakdowns available by metropolitan area show that the San Jose-Sunnyvale-Santa Clara metropolitan area has the highest average salary at $86,380. In September 2021, the BLS projected growth for the field "to grow 9 percent from 2020 to 2030", which is "about as fast as the average for all occupations". The 2010-2011 Occupational Outlook Handbook states, "Workers in this occupation tend to be older than workers in the rest of the economy. As a result, there may be more workers retiring from this occupation than other occupations. However, relatively large numbers of graduates from MLS programs may cause competition in some areas and for some jobs."

Diversity in librarianship

Ethics 
Practicing library professionals and members of the American Library Association recognize and abide by the ALA Code of Ethics. According to the American Library Association, "In a political system grounded in an informed citizenry, we are members of a profession explicitly committed to intellectual freedom and freedom of access to information. We have a special obligation to ensure the free flow of information and ideas to present and future generations." The ALA Code of Ethics was adopted in the winter of 1939, and updated on June 29, 2021.

Types of librarianship

Public
The study of librarianship for public libraries covers issues such as cataloging; collection development for a diverse community; information literacy; readers' advisory; community standards; public services-focused librarianship; serving a diverse community of adults, children, and teens; intellectual freedom; censorship; and legal and budgeting issues. The public library as a commons or public sphere based on the work of Jürgen Habermas has become a central metaphor in the 21st century.

Most people are familiar with municipal public libraries, but there are, in fact, four different types of public libraries: association libraries, municipal public libraries, school district libraries, and special district public libraries. It is important to be able to distinguish among the four. Each receives its funding through different sources, each is established by a different set of voters, and not all are subject to municipal civil service governance.

School 
The study of school librarianship covers library services for children in primary through secondary school. In some regions, the local government may have stricter standards for the education and certification of school librarians (who are often considered a special case of teacher), than for other librarians, and the educational program will include those local criteria. School librarianship may also include issues of intellectual freedom, pedagogy, information literacy, and how to build a cooperative curriculum with the teaching staff.

Academic
The study of academic librarianship covers library services for colleges and universities. Issues of special importance to the field may include copyright; technology, digital libraries, and digital repositories; academic freedom; open access to scholarly works; as well as specialized knowledge of subject areas important to the institution and the relevant reference works. Librarians often divide focus individually as liaisons on particular schools within a college or university.

Some academic librarians are considered faculty, and hold similar academic ranks to those of professors, while others are not. In either case, the minimal qualification is a Master of Arts in Library Studies or a Master of Arts in Library Science. Some academic libraries may only require a master's degree in a specific academic field or a related field, such as educational technology.

Archival
The study of archives includes the training of archivists, librarians specially trained to maintain and build archives of records intended for historical preservation. Special issues include physical preservation, conservation, and restoration of materials and mass deacidification; specialist catalogs; solo work; access; and appraisal. Many archivists are also trained historians specializing in the period covered by the archive.

The archival mission includes three major goals: To identify papers and records with enduring value, preserve the identified papers, and make the papers available to others.

There are significant differences between libraries and archives, including differences in collections, records creation, item acquisition, and preferred behavior in the institution. The major difference in collections is that library collections typically comprise published items (books, magazines, etc.), while archival collections are usually unpublished works (letters, diaries, etc.) In managing their collections, libraries will categorize items individually, but archival items never stand alone. An archival record gains meaning and importance from its relationship to the entire collection; therefore archival items are usually received by the archive in a group or batch. Library collections are created by many individuals, as each author and illustrator create their own publication; in contrast, an archive usually collects the records of one person, family, institution, or organization, so the archival items will have fewer sources of authors.

Another difference between a library and an archive is that library materials are created explicitly by authors or others who are working intentionally. They choose to write and publish a book, for example, and that occurs. Archival materials are not created intentionally. Instead, the items in an archive are what remains after a business, institution, or person conducts their normal business practices. The collection of letters, documents, receipts, ledger books, etc. was created with the intention to perform daily tasks, they were not created in order to populate a future archive.

As for item acquisition, libraries receive items individually, but archival items will usually become part of the archive's collection as a cohesive group.

Behavior in an archive differs from behavior in a library, as well. In most libraries, patrons are allowed and encouraged to browse the stacks, because the books are openly available to the public. Archival items almost never circulate, and someone interested in viewing documents must request them of the archivist and may only view them in a closed reading room. Those who wish to visit an archive will usually begin with an entrance interview. This is an opportunity for the archivist to register the researcher, confirm their identity, and determine their research needs. This is also the opportune time for the archivist to review reading room rules, which vary but typically include policies on privacy, photocopying, the use of finding aids, and restrictions on food, drinks, and other activities or items that could damage the archival materials.

Special
Special libraries are libraries established to meet the highly specialized requirements of professional or business groups. A library is special depending on whether it covers a specialized collection, a special subject, or a particular group of users, or even the type of parent organization. A library can be special if it only serves a particular group of users such as lawyers, doctors, nurses, etc. These libraries are called professional libraries and special librarians include almost any other form of librarianship, including those who serve in medical libraries (and hospitals or medical schools), corporations, news agencies, government organizations, or other special collections. The issues at these libraries are specific to their industries but may include solo work, corporate financing, specialized collection development, and extensive self-promotion to potential patrons. Special librarians have their own professional organization, the Special Libraries Association (SLA).

National Center for Atmospheric Research (NCAR) is considered a special library. Its mission is to support, preserve, make accessible, and collaborate in the scholarly research and educational outreach activities of UCAR/NCAR.

Another is the Federal Bureau of Investigation Library. According to its website, "The FBI Library supports the FBI in its statutory mission to uphold the law through the investigation of violations of federal criminal law; to protect the United States from foreign intelligence and terrorist activities; and to provide leadership and law enforcement assistance to federal, state, local, and international agencies.

A further example would be the classified CIA Library. It is a resource to employees of the Central Intelligence Agency, containing over 125,000 written materials, subscribes to around 1,700 periodicals, and had collections in three areas: Historical Intelligence, Circulating, and Reference. In February 1997, three librarians working at the institution spoke to Information Outlook, a publication of the SLA, revealing that the library had been created in 1947, the importance of the library in disseminating information to employees, even with a small staff, and how the library organizes its materials. In May 2021, an unnamed gay librarian, for the institution, was shown in a recruitment video for the agency.

Preservation

Preservation librarians most often work in academic libraries. Their focus is on the management of preservation activities that seek to maintain access to content within books, manuscripts, archival materials, and other library resources. Examples of activities managed by preservation librarians include binding, conservation, digital and analog reformatting, digital preservation, and environmental monitoring.

See also

 Archival science
 Bibliography
 Documentation science
 History of libraries
 Informatics (academic field)
 Information management
 Information retrieval
 Information science
 Information systems
 Internet search engines and libraries
 I-school
 Knowledge management
 Librarian
 Libraries and the LGBTQ community
 Library and information science
 Library history
 Library portal
 List of library associations
 Museology
 Museum informatics
 Outline of library science
 Subject indexing
 Timeline of women in library science

Notes

References

Further reading
 International Journal of Library Science
 Lafontaine, Gerard S. (1958). Dictionary of Terms Used in the Paper, Printing, and Allied Industries. Toronto: H. Smith Paper Mills. 110 p.
 The Oxford Guide to Library Research (2005) – 
 Thompson, Elizabeth H. (1943). A.L.A. Glossary of Library Terms, with a Selection of Terms in Related Fields, prepared under the direction of the Committee on Library Terminology of the American Library Association. Chicago, Ill.: American Library Association. viii, 189 p. SBN 8389-0000-3
 V-LIB 1.2 (2008 Vartavan Library Classification, over 700 fields of sciences & arts classified according to a relational philosophy, currently sold under license in the UK by Rosecastle Ltd. (see Vartavan-Frame)

External links

LISNews.org – librarian and information science news
LISWire.com – librarian and information science wire

 
Humanities